East Antrim is a parliamentary constituency in the United Kingdom House of Commons. The current MP is Sammy Wilson of the DUP.

A constituency with identical boundaries is also used for elections to the Northern Ireland Assembly.

Constituency profile
The seat covers the east coast from Cushendall down to Carrickfergus. The seat is strongly unionist and one of the few areas of Northern Ireland which voted to leave the European Union.

Boundaries

The original county constituency comprised the eastern part of County Antrim, being carved out of the former Antrim constituency. From 1885, East Antrim consisted of the baronies of Belfast Lower and Glenarm Upper, that part of the barony of Antrim Upper not in the constituency of South Antrim, that part of the barony of Antrim Lower not in the constituency of Mid Antrim, that part of the barony of Belfast Upper consisting of the parish of Ballymartin and the parish of Templepatrick apart from the townland of Ballyutoag, and the town of Carrickfergus.

It returned one Member of Parliament 1885–1922.

The current seat was created in boundary changes in 1983, as part of an expansion of Northern Ireland's constituencies from 12 to 17, and was predominantly made up from parts of North Antrim and South Antrim. Since further revisions in 1995 (when it lost part of the district of Newtownabbey to the North Belfast constituency) it now covers the entirety of the districts of Larne and Carrickfergus, as well as part of Newtownabbey and Moyle.

Prior to the 2010 general election the Boundary Commission originally proposed two significant changes for East Antrim. In the south of the constituency it was proposed to transfer a further part of Newtownabbey to the North Belfast constituency whilst in the north the seat would have gained the Glens and Ballycastle in Moyle district from North Antrim. East Antrim would have been renamed 'Antrim Coast & Glens'. However this latter part of the proposal raised many questions, with some already arguing that the Glens have no natural ties to Jordanstown (and in 1995 the previous Boundary Commission cited this very reason when rejecting such a proposal).

Following consultation and revising the recommendations, the new boundaries for East Antrim were confirmed and passed through Parliament by the Northern Ireland Parliamentary Constituencies Order as follows:
The whole district of Carrickfergus
The whole district of Larne
Glenaan, Glenariff, and Glendun from the Moyle district
From Newtownabbey, the wards of Jordanstown, Monkstown, and Rostulla

History

1885 until 1922
The constituency was a strongly conservative then unionist area, where republican and nationalist candidates were not elected.

From 1886 to 1974 the Conservative and Unionist members of the United Kingdom House of Commons formed a single Parliamentary party.

From 1905 there was an Ulster Unionist organisation, but MPs sponsored by it are classified as Irish Unionists until the 1921 Northern Ireland general election made the partition of Ireland effective so that Irish Unionism ceased to be a realistic objective.

A victory for the Unionist candidate in 1918 by 15,206 votes to Sinn Féin's 861 votes demonstrated the virtual unanimity of the unionist support.

Consequently, Sinn Féin did not contest the 1919 by-election in the constituency.

In 1922, the constituency was incorporated into the Antrim constituency, which from 1950 until 1983 was divided into the North Antrim and South Antrim constituencies.

The First Dáil
Sinn Féin contested the general election of 1918 on the platform that instead of taking up any seats they won in the United Kingdom Parliament, they would establish a revolutionary assembly in Dublin. In republican theory every MP elected in Ireland was a potential Deputy to this assembly. In practice only the Sinn Féin members accepted the offer.

The revolutionary First Dáil assembled on 21 January 1919 and last met on 10 May 1921. The First Dáil, according to a resolution passed on 10 May 1921, was formally dissolved on the assembling of the Second Dáil. This took place on 16 August 1921.

In 1921 Sinn Féin decided to use the UK authorised elections for the Northern Ireland House of Commons and the House of Commons of Southern Ireland as a poll for the Irish Republic's Second Dáil. This area, in republican theory, was incorporated in a seven-member Dáil constituency of Antrim.

Constituency since 1983
The constituency is overwhelmingly unionist, with the combined votes for nationalist parties rarely exceeding 10%. However, there have been above average votes for parties outside the traditional unionist block, such as the Alliance and the Conservatives. In the local government elections for the equivalent area many votes often go to independent candidates or groups such as the Newtownabbey Ratepayers Association. While the SDLP sprung a surprise in 1998 by overtaking a DUP candidate to win the final seat due to Ulster Unionist transfers – the first time that any nationalist candidate has benefited in this way.

The main interest in Westminster Elections has been the contest between the Ulster Unionist Party and the Democratic Unionist Party. In 1983 the UUP were only 367 votes ahead of the DUP. As part of a pact to oppose the Anglo-Irish Agreement the DUP did not contest the seat until 1992 but they still failed to come close, though in the 1996 elections to the Northern Ireland Forum they were only slightly behind the UUP. But in the 2001 general election they achieved an astonishing result when they came with 128 votes of winning the Westminster seat, despite not having targeted it. In the 2003 Assembly election they followed this up by gaining two additional MLAs and outpolling the UUP for the first time.

The DUP remained eager to take the Westminster seat and in the 2005 general election they did so.

Members of Parliament 
The Member of Parliament since the 2005 general election is Sammy Wilson of the Democratic Unionist Party. In that election he defeated Roy Beggs of the Ulster Unionist Party, who had sat for the seat since it was created at the 1983 general election.

Election results

Elections in the 2010s

Elections in the 2000s

Elections in the 1990s

Elections in the 1980s

Elections in the 1910s

Elections in the 1900s

Elections in the 1890s

Elections in the 1880s

See also 
 List of parliamentary constituencies in Northern Ireland

References

External links 
2017 Election House Of Commons Library 2017 Election report
A Vision Of Britain Through Time (Constituency elector numbers)

Bibliography

East Antrim
Westminster constituencies in County Antrim (historic)
Dáil constituencies in Northern Ireland (historic)
Constituencies of the Parliament of the United Kingdom established in 1885
Constituencies of the Parliament of the United Kingdom disestablished in 1922
Constituencies of the Parliament of the United Kingdom established in 1983
Westminster Parliamentary constituencies in Northern Ireland